Chamicero de Perijá is a small nature reserve in Colombia established in 2014. It is centered on the Colombian side of the Serranía de Perijá mountain range, part of the East Andes. It holds incredible biodiversity and home to numerous endangered and endemic bird species. Chamicero de Perijá protects a  area of cloud forest habitat which is home to several rare bird taxa, including the Perijá thistletail, the Perijá metaltail, the Perijá brush-finch, an endemic subspecies of the rufous antpitta, and the Perijá tapaculo.

Biodiversity 
It reserve is home to the Perijá Antpitta,  Perijá thistletail, the Perijá metaltail, the Perijá brush-finch and Perijá Hemispingus, all rare bird species endemic to the region. There are other endemic bird species in the region, but are more commonly come across, including the Rufous Spinetail and the native yellow breasted brush-finch. Other birds found in the region include both the Crested Quetzal, Golden-headed Quetzal, Barred Fruiteater, Andean Condor, black chested Buzzard-Eagle, Plushcap, the Buff-Breasted Mountain-Tanager, Lacrimose Mountain-Tanager, Hook-billed Kites, White-rumped Hawk and the Páramo Seedeater. There are many more species that have still not been documented yet in the region.

Geography 
The Chamicero de Perijá reserve is located at the northern part of South America's Andes Mountain range, as part of the smaller Serranía de Perijá mountain range. The region is covered mainly by high Andean forest and Andean páramo and subpáramo grasslands. The region also has a number of rivers that run through it, mainly feeders for the Manaure River.

Politics and Founding 
For decades, the region was inhabited by guerrilla fighters and narcos. In 2006, the Columbian government redoubled efforts to establish control in the area. Then in 2014, the ProAves and Rainforest Trust raised over $180,000 to buy the 1,850 acres to establish the reserve. This is helping to protect it from deforestation, which had picked up pace in the years prior. Since then, birders and scientist have entered into the reserve to more thoroughly document the region and its endemic species.

References 

Nature reserves in Colombia
Protected areas established in 2014
2014 establishments in Colombia
Andean forests